Chessgame is a British television series produced by Granada Television for the ITV network in 1983.

Based on a series of novels by Anthony Price, the series dealt with the activities of a quartet of counter-intelligence agents: David Audley (Terence Stamp), Faith Steerforth (Carmen du Sautoy), Nick Hannah (Michael Culver) and Hugh Roskill (Robin Sachs).

One series of six episodes was made.
 "The Alamut Ambush"
 "Enter Hassan"
 "The Roman Collection"
 "Digging up the Future"
 "Flying Blind"
 "Cold Wargame"

The series was rebroadcast as three TV movies in 1986 called The Alamut Ambush, The Deadly Recruits, and The Cold War Killers.

The theme music was composed by Christopher Gunning.

External links
 
 Addenda to CRIME FICTION IV: Anthony Price, Otto Penzler & others.

Espionage television series
ITV television dramas
1983 British television series debuts
1983 British television series endings
Television series by ITV Studios
Television shows produced by Granada Television
English-language television shows